Lucăcești may refer to several villages in Romania:

 Lucăcești, a village in Mireșu Mare Commune, Maramureș County
 Lucăcești, a village in Drăgoiești Commune, Suceava County

See also 
 Luca (disambiguation)
 Lucăceni (disambiguation)
 Lucăcilă River (disambiguation)